The Party's Over may refer to:

Film and TV 
 The Party's Over (1934 film), starring Stuart Erwin and Ann Sothern, based on the 1933 Broadway play
 The Party's Over (1965 film), directed by Guy Hamilton, starring Oliver Reed, with a score by John Barry
 The Party's Over (1991 film), written and directed by Alessandro Benvenuti
 The Party's Over (2001 film), political documentary
 "The Party's Over" (CSI: NY), episode of the TV series CSI: NY

Albums
 The Party's Over (Murphy's Law album), 2001
 The Party's Over (Smoking Popes album), 2001
 The Party's Over (Talk Talk album), 1982
 The Party's Over...Thanks for Coming, 1993 album by The Party
 The Party's Over and Other Great Willie Nelson Songs, 1969 album by Willie Nelson

Songs
 "The Party's Over" (1956 song), by Jule Styne, Betty Comden and Adolph Green
 "The Party's Over" (Sandra Reemer song), 1976
 "The Party's Over" (Willie Nelson song)
 "The Party's Over (Hopelessly in Love)", a song by Journey from Captured

Other uses
 The Party's Over: Oil, War, and the Fate of Industrial Societies, a 2003 book by Richard Heinberg

See also
 Party's Over, a 2017 EP by Astrid S
 The Party Is Over, a 1960 Argentine drama film
 When the Party's Over (disambiguation)